In Islamic demonology, Sut (مسوط) is one of the five sons of Iblis mentioned by Muslim ibn al-Hajjaj.  He is a devil who suggests lies.  His four brothers are named: Awar (اعور or لأعوار), Zalambur (زلنبور), Dasim (داسم), and Tir (ثبر). Each of them is linked to another psychological function, which they try to encourage to prevent humans spiritual development.

References

Demons in Islam